Villafría is one of fifteen parishes (administrative divisions) in Pravia, a municipality within the province and autonomous community of Asturias, in northern Spain.

The population is 76 (INE 2011).

Villages and hamlets
 Recuevo (Ricouvu)
 Villafría
 Villamuñín

References

Parishes in Pravia